Abdou Karim Sow (born 22 May 2003) is a Swiss professional footballer who plays as a centre-back for Swiss Super League club Lausanne-Sport.

Club career
A youth product of Estavayer-le-Lac, Fribourg, Central FR and Young Boys, Sow signed his first professional contract with Lausanne-Sport on 5 March 2021. He made his professional debut with Lausanne in a 2–2 Swiss Super League tie against Basel on 24 August 2021.

Personal life 
Born in Switzerland, Sow is of Senegalese descent.

References

External links
 SFV Profile
 SFL Profile

2003 births
Living people
People from Payerne
Swiss men's footballers
Switzerland youth international footballers
Swiss people of Senegalese descent
Association football central defenders
FC Fribourg players
BSC Young Boys players
FC Lausanne-Sport players
Swiss Super League players
Sportspeople from the canton of Vaud